The Mad, Mad World Tour was a concert tour by American singer Meat Loaf that started on June 22, 2012 in Austin, Texas and concluded on October 19, 2012 in Uncasville, Connecticut. The tour was in support of his Hell in a Handbasket album.

Tour dates

Cancellations and rescheduled shows

Setlist
Runnin' For the Red Light
Dead Ringer For Love
If It Ain't Broke, Break It
Stand in the Storm
Paradise By the Dashboard Light
Living on the Outside
Los Angeloser
You Took the Words Right Out of My Mouth
The Giving Tree
Mad, Mad World
Our Love and Our Souls
Two Out Of Three Ain't Bad
Rock n' Roll Dreams Come Through
Bat Out of Hell
I'd Do Anything For Love (But I Won't Do That)
Boneyard/ Freebird/ All Revved Up With No Place To Go (At Durham concert 2/3 Ain't Bad)

Band
Meat Loaf: lead vocals
Patti Russo: female lead vocals
John Miceli: drums
Paul Crook: guitar
Randy Flowers: guitar, backing vocals
Dave Luther: saxophone, keyboards, backing vocals
Danny Miranda: bass, backing vocals
Justin Avery: piano, backing vocals

References

Meat Loaf concert tours
2012 concert tours